Qaleh-ye Changai (also Romanized as Qal‘eh-ye Changā’ī; also known as Changā’ī) is a village in Dasht-e Lali Rural District, in the Central District of Lali County, Khuzestan Province, Iran. At the 2006 census, its population was 808, in 116 families.

References 

Populated places in Lali County